The 2010 Copa Petrobras Buenos Aires was a professional tennis tournament played on red clay courts. It was the seventh edition of the tournament which was part of the 2010 ATP Challenger Tour. It took place in Buenos Aires, Argentina between 4 and 11 October 2010.

ATP entrants

Seeds

 Rankings are as of September 27, 2010.

Other entrants
The following players received wildcards into the singles main draw:
  Facundo Argüello
  Guilherme Clézar
  Fabio Fognini
  Agustín Velotti

The following players received entry from the qualifying draw:
  Juan-Martín Aranguren
  Andrés Molteni
  Guido Pella
  Marco Trungelliti
  Cătălin Gârd (Lucky loser replacing Guillermo Alcaide)

Champions

Singles

 Máximo González def.  Pablo Cuevas, 6–4, 6–3

Doubles

 Carlos Berlocq /  Brian Dabul def.  Jorge Aguilar /  Federico del Bonis, 6–3, 6–2

External links
Official website
ITF Search 
ATP official site

Copa Petrobras Buenos Aires
Clay court tennis tournaments
Tennis tournaments in Argentina